Ziepniekkalns is a neighborhood of Riga, Latvia. It is located in the Pārdaugava section of Riga close to the city's southern border. Ziepniekkalns is the latest out of all Riga's neighborhoods. 
It was built in the late 1980s and early 1990s and mostly consists of Soviet-built 10 story apartment buildings. However, there are still many older buildings in Ziepniekkalns constructed in the early 1960s. There is a major contrast between older 3 story buildings and newer 10 story ones. 
In the mid-1990s, route 19 trolleybus was extended to the heart of new Ziepniekkalns and now final stop is at the Mego supermarket. The trolleybus route 4 runs through the city center to Jugla.

Gallery

References

Sources 

Neighbourhoods in Riga